The Daughters of the Improved Benevolent Protective Order of Elks of the World are the female auxiliary of the Improved Benevolent Protective Order of Elks of the World, an African American spin off of the Benevolent and Protective Order of Elks. Like the latter organization, which officially has female auxiliaries, the Daughters are also officially recognized and encouraged by its male counterpart.

Mission 
The Daughters takes the 13th chapter of First Corinthians as their guide. Their motivating principles include charity, justice, patriotism and sisterly and brotherly love.

History 

The first local group or "Temple" of the society was founded as the Norfolk Temple No. 1 in Norfolk, Virginia by Emma V. Kelley. The first "public" meeting was held in July 1903 at the St. John African Methodist Episcopal Church with forty participants. The Improved Elks helped organize a convention on September 9, 1903, where the Daughters organized as a national organization, or "Grand Temple", and drew up a ritual, constitution and by-laws. A juvenile department was founded in 1907.

Structure and membership 

As stated, the national organization is known as the "Grand Temple" and locals are called "Temples". In 1979 the Daughters was reported to have Temples in the United States, Canada, Mexico, Cuba, the Virgin Islands, other parts of the West Indies and Panama. That year it was reported to have 450,000 members.

Philanthropy 

In the Orders first fifty years of existence it raised over two million dollars in college scholarships for youth of all races. The Daughters were also active during the civil rights movement during the 1960s and 1970s.

See also 
Daughters of Isis

References

External links 
Official website of the Improved Elks and Daughters of the Elks
Proceedings of the 45th annual convention of the Daughters of I.B.P.O.E. of the World, Grand Temple

Benevolent and Protective Order of Elks
African-American women's organizations
Organizations established in 1902
Ethnic fraternal orders in the United States